The Rising of the Shield Hero is an anime series adapted from the light novels of the same title written by Aneko Yusagi. At 2019's Crunchyroll Expo, it was announced that the series will receive a second and third season. At 2020's virtual Crunchyroll Expo, it was announced that the second season will premiere in 2021. Masato Jinbo replaced Takao Abo as director, and the rest of the staff members reprised their roles, with production by Kinema Citrus and DR Movie. During "Kadokawa Light Novel Expo 2020", it was revealed that the second season will premiere in October 2021, but it was later delayed. The second season aired from April 6 to June 29, 2022, on AT-X and other channels. It ran for 13 episodes. On May 2, 2022, Crunchyroll announced the English dub for the second season, which began streaming on May 4.


Episode list

Home media release

Japanese

References

2022 Japanese television seasons
Anime postponed due to the COVID-19 pandemic 
The Rising of the Shield Hero episode lists